Rusty Taco is an American-based chain of fast food restaurants originating in Dallas, Texas in 2010, by founders Rusty Fenton and his wife, Denise Fenton. Rusty Taco is a subsidiary of Gala Capital Partners. , there are 37 restaurants in nine states.

History
Rusty Taco was founded by Rusty Fenton, his wife Denise and Steve Dunn in 2010. The first location was opened at a former gas station. Rusty Fenton died in 2013 of kidney cancer.

Name change  
The name was shortened to R Taco in 2015, but on September 5, 2018, R Taco announced it was changing its name back to Rusty Taco.

Inspire Brands subsidiary 
In 2014, a majority of shares of Rusty Taco were acquired by Buffalo Wild Wings. Buffalo Wild Wings along with R Taco were acquired by Arby's Restaurant Group in 2018, forming Inspire Brands.

On December 19, 2022, Inspire Brands announced that it had sold Rusty Taco to Gala Capital Partners, owner of Cicis Pizza, Dunn Brothers Coffee, and Mooyah.

References

External links
 

2010 establishments in Texas
2014 mergers and acquisitions
2018 mergers and acquisitions
Fast-food chains of the United States
Fast-food franchises
Fast-food Mexican restaurants
Restaurants established in 2010
Inspire Brands